The third USS Curlew (AM-69/IX-170) was a  in the United States Navy during World War II.

Curlew was built in 1938 by Charleston Shipbuilding and Dry Dock Co., Charleston, South Carolina, as Kittiwake; purchased by the U.S. Navy on 6 August 1940; and commissioned 7 November 1940.

East Coast assignments 
Clearing Boston 10 May 1941, Curlew swept mines off Staten Island, New York, until 4 October when she put out for Cristóbal, Canal Zone. While it protected the Panama Canal, the ship was commanded by Joe Rollins, later a prominent attorney in Houston, Texas. She served in the 15th Naval District until 10 February 1944 when she reported to Section Base, Little Creek, Virginia, for patrol and minesweeping operations until the end of the war. Re-classified Unclassified Miscellaneous Auxiliary IX-170 on 1 June 1944, she arrived at Newport, Rhode Island 14 November 1945.

Decommissioning 
Curlew was decommissioned there 5 December 1945, and transferred to the Maritime Commission 27 September 1946 for disposal.

Curlew was converted into a civilian fishing vessel following her decommissioning, and still serves this role as of 2017, under the name Clipper Express.

References

External links
 
 Ships of the U.S. Navy, 1940-1945 Minecraft

 

Catbird-class minesweepers
Ships built in Charleston, South Carolina
1938 ships
World War II minesweepers of the United States